The 2005 Women's African Nations Championship was the 12th edition of the Women's African Volleyball Championship organised by Africa's governing volleyball body, the Confédération Africaine de Volleyball. It was held in Abuja, Nigeria, from 8 to 15 September 2005.

Kenya won the championship defeating Nigeria in the final, while Egypt defeated Tunisia to finish third.

Competing nations
The following national teams have confirmed participation:

Venue

Format
The tournament is played in two stages. In the first stage, the participants are divided in two groups. A single round-robin format is played within each group to determine the teams' group position (as per procedure below). 

The second stage is a knockout format, the top two teams in each group advance to the semifinals, third placed teams in each group play for 5th-6th and fourth placed teams in each group play for 7th-8th place. Winners of the semifinals play the final, while losers play for third and fourth places.

Pool standing procedure
 Match points (win = 2 points, loss = 1 point)
 Number of matches won
 Sets ratio
 Points ratio

Pool composition
The drawing of lots was held in Abuja, Nigeria on 7 September 2005.

Group stage

Group A

|}

|}

Group B

|}

|}

Final round

Semifinals

|}

7th place match

|}

5th place match

|}

3rd place match

|}

Final

|}

Final standing

Source: CAVB.

Awards

MVP
 Tahani Toson
Best Setter
 Asma Ben Sheikh
Best Receiver
 Wafa Monter
Best Digger
 Arabia Rafrafi

Best Spiker
 Nihel Ghoul
Best Blocker
 Ingy El-Shamy
Best Server
 Asma Ben Sheikh

Source: CAVB.

References
 CAVB semifinals report.
 CAVB 3rd to 8th place report.
 CAVB final report.

External links
 Results

2005 Women
African championship, women
Women's African Volleyball Championship
2005 in Nigerian sport
International volleyball competitions hosted by Nigeria